Nicrophorus satanas is a burying beetle described by Edmund Reitter in 1893.

General Characteristics
Nicrophorus satanas is a burying beetle commonly found in Europe and Asia.  They can measure between 2.5 and 3.8 cm.  They have thick bodies with a black exterior.

References

Silphidae
Beetles of Asia
Beetles of Europe
Beetles described in 1893
Taxa named by Edmund Reitter